Maria Harutjunjan (17 September 1995) is an Estonian swimmer.

She was born in Tartu. In 2014 she graduated from Audentes Sports Gymnasium in Tallinn, and 2019 Wyoming University in USA.

She began her swimming career in 2002, coached by Mihhail Krupnin. She is multiple-times Estonian champion in different swimming disciplines. 2010–2018 she was a member of Estonian national swimming team.

References

Living people
1995 births
Estonian female breaststroke swimmers
Estonian female butterfly swimmers
Estonian female freestyle swimmers
Sportspeople from Tartu
Estonian people of Armenian descent
21st-century Estonian women